Gibson Lake is a lake in the municipality of Head, Clara and Maria, Renfrew County in Eastern Ontario, Canada. It is in the Saint Lawrence River drainage basin. The  major outflow, at the northeast, is Gibson Creek which flows to Big Gibson Lake and then the Ottawa River. The Ottawa River flows to the Saint Lawrence River. Ontario Highway 17 passes on the north side of a lake, from which there is access to a roadside park on the lake.

References

Other map sources:

Lakes of Renfrew County